Wilko de Vogt (born 17 September 1975 in Breda, North Brabant) is a former Dutch football goalkeeper.

De Vogt started his professional career in 1996 with NAC Breda after he had come through their youth system. In 2001, he was transferred to Sheffield United. However, after only six appearances for the club in two years, he returned to the Netherlands when he was sold to RBC Roosendaal. He has since played for RKC Waalwijk and over 200 matches for FC Oss. In 2010, he joined FC Twente as their third choice goalkeeper. He has played this role for VVV-Venlo and NAC Breda, before ending his career in July 2013.

References
 Profile

External links

1975 births
Living people
Dutch footballers
Dutch expatriate footballers
Association football goalkeepers
Sheffield United F.C. players
NAC Breda players
TOP Oss players
RBC Roosendaal players
RKC Waalwijk players
FC Twente players
VVV-Venlo players
Eredivisie players
Eerste Divisie players
Expatriate footballers in England
Footballers from Breda